Jeanine Ferris Pirro (born June 2, 1951) is an American television host, author, and a former New York State judge, prosecutor, and politician. Pirro was the host of Fox News Channel's Justice with Judge Jeanine until 2022 when she became a co-host of The Five. She was a frequent contributor to NBC News, including regular appearances on The Today Show. She was also the first female judge elected in Westchester County, New York.

Pirro was elected the first female district attorney of Westchester County. As district attorney, Pirro gained visibility in cases of domestic abuse and crimes against the elderly. Pirro briefly sought the Republican nomination for United States Senate to run against Hillary Clinton in 2006, but dropped out to accept the nomination for New York Attorney General; she lost the general election to Democrat Andrew Cuomo. In 2018, she wrote the book Liars, Leakers, and Liberals: The Case Against the Anti-Trump Conspiracy.

Pirro was named as a defendant in a February 2021 defamation lawsuit by Smartmatic, in relation to false claims of election fraud in the 2020 United States presidential election, though the claims against her were dismissed by a judge in March 2022.

Early life
Jeanine Ferris was born and raised in Elmira, New York, the daughter of Lebanese-American parents. Her father was a mobile-home salesman, and her mother was a department-store model who spent much of her childhood in Beirut. Her parents were Maronite Catholics. Pirro knew she wanted to be an attorney from the age of six.

She graduated from Notre Dame High School in Elmira in three years, interning in the Chemung County District Attorney's office during her time in high school. Pirro then graduated with a Bachelor of Arts from the University at Buffalo. She received her J.D. degree at Albany Law School of Union University in 1975, where she was an editor of the law review.

Westchester County law career

Assistant District Attorney
In 1975, District Attorney Carl Vergari appointed Pirro to the position of Assistant District Attorney of Westchester County in New York State, where she began her career by writing appeals and handling minor cases. In 1977, Pirro approached Vergari and requested that he apply for a federal grant for local district attorney's offices to establish bureaus that specialized in domestic violence. She hoped that Vergari would take advantage of potential funding, as well as a 1977 change in New York law that moved many domestic violence cases from family court to criminal court. Vergari agreed to apply for the grant, and his office became one of four in the nation to win the grant. In 1978, he appointed Pirro to be the first chief of the new Domestic Violence and Child Abuse Bureau. Pirro was known to be an aggressive bureau chief. Due to possible coercion, she had a strict policy against dropping cases at a victim's request.

Many people praised Pirro for her passion as Domestic Violence Bureau Chief, but she attracted increasing criticism from some colleagues for what they considered her  "attention-grabbing" behavior and violations of tradition. On multiple occasions, Chief District Attorney Vergari spoke to Pirro concerning her violation of office policy. She had issued press releases with her own name—and not Vergari's—on top. The relationship between Pirro and Vergari disintegrated in the late 1980s, after Pirro claimed sole responsibility for the establishment of the Domestic Violence and Child Abuse Bureau.

On June 1, 1990, just five months prior to Pirro's first appearance on the ballot for County Court Judge, she attracted widespread attention for rushing to conduct a bedside investigation of Maria Amaya at the Intensive Care Unit of United Hospital in Port Chester. Amaya had been charged with four counts of second-degree murder for the deaths of her four children. She was a 36-year-old immigrant from El Salvador who had a history of being hospitalized for mental issues. Amaya had killed the four children and attempted suicide, believing that they were being corrupted by drugs and sex.

Vergari had served as district attorney for Pirro's entire tenure as an assistant district attorney and her time on the bench. In 1999, he critiqued Pirro as "bright and capable" and someone who "plays hardball seeking publicity," but who was also "very self-centered in everything she does." While recognized for her prosecution of domestic violence, she was criticized for her relative prosecutorial absence in bringing charges involving major public corruption or organized crime. These criticisms intensified when Pirro's husband was later convicted of several felonies tied to organized crime, including tax evasion and conspiracy. "One would have to believe that there's no organized crime in Westchester County, not a single corrupt official, and every union in this county is as clean as the driven snow," according to William I. Aronwald, who headed the Federal Organized Crime Strike Force during the 1970s and who was targeted for assassination by Colombo crime family head Carmine Persico.

During a 1986 abortive campaign for Lieutenant Governor of New York, Pirro boasted to have never lost a case in "about 50 trials." This number was disputed when presented in 2005 to colleagues, who said that the real number of trials personally handled by Pirro "wasn't more than 10." Pirro's then-spokesman, Anne Marie Corbalis, contended only that Pirro had a "100% felony conviction rate" as an Assistant District Attorney.

Court Judge
Pirro left the District Attorney's office after her November 1990 election as a judge of the Westchester County Court. She had successfully run on the Republican and Conservative party lines against Democratic nominee and New Castle Town Justice Lawrence D. Lenihan and Right to Life Party nominee August C. Nimphius, Jr. When she was sworn in on January 1, 1991, Pirro became Westchester County's first female judge. She was a judge for two years.

District Attorney
In November 1993, Pirro was elected Westchester County District Attorney; she was the first woman to hold that position. She was re-elected in 1997 and 2001. On May 23, 2005, Pirro announced that she would not seek re-election to a fourth term as Westchester County District Attorney.

On December 31, 1993—within hours of Pirro's midnight inauguration as District Attorney—Scripps newspaper heiress Anne Scripps Douglas was savagely bludgeoned in the head with a hammer by her estranged husband, Scott Douglas, as she slept in their Bronxville, New York, home. By the time police arrived, Scott Douglas had fled the scene. Anne Scripps Douglas died in the hospital on January 6. Scott Douglas subsequently committed suicide by jumping off the Tappan Zee Bridge. Pirro, already known as a passionate prosecutor of domestic violence cases, was a frequent presence in the media during the period between the murder and when Scott Douglas's body washed ashore in Riverdale in early March 1994. This increase in Pirro's national profile led to her surfacing as a frequent contributor on network and cable television news in June 1994, when O.J. Simpson was arrested for the murder of his ex-wife, appearing frequently as an analyst on Nightline, Larry King Live, and Geraldo.

Within months of taking office, Pirro undertook a costly renovation to the district attorney's facilities and expanded to an additional floor of the county courthouse. The largest expenses were a new kitchenette and a media room, costing $20,000, to assist Pirro's growing profile; additional expenditures were made to remodel her personal office with mahogany.

Pirro was the first female president of the New York State District Attorneys Association. Also while district attorney, she was appointed by then-Governor George Pataki to chair the New York State Commission on Domestic Violence Fatality Review Board. Its report and recommendations resulted in legislation passing that enhanced protections of, and safeguards for, the victims of domestic abuse.

During her tenure as district attorney, she repeatedly refused to reopen the case of the murder of Angela Correa by Jeffrey Deskovic. In 1990, Deskovic was falsely convicted of killing the then-15-year-old Correa, and spent 16 years in prison before he was exonerated by DNA evidence; the real killer eventually confessed to the crime. Deskovic later won a $41.6 million lawsuit against Daniel Stephens and Westchester County for his wrongful conviction.

Statewide political career

1986 Lieutenant Gubernatorial candidacy 
On May 26, 1986, Pirro, then an assistant district attorney, was announced as the running mate of Westchester County Executive and presumptive Republican gubernatorial nominee Andrew O'Rourke. Pirro was selected by O'Rourke and New York State Republican Committee Chairman Anthony J. Colavita after nearly a dozen individuals declined the position, including Erie County Executive Ed Rutkowski, Hempstead Presiding Supervisor Thomas Gulotta, and the Executives of Broome and Oneida Counties.
Colavita, who said at the press conference that he "had so many say 'no' to me (during the lieutenant governor search), it doesn't hurt anymore," pointed to Pirro's prosecutorial experience, ability to effectively use crime as an issue, Italian married name, youth, and status as a woman when asked about her strengths as a candidate.

Pirro's selection frustrated many New York Republicans, with Assembly Minority Leader Clarence D. Rappleyea Jr. traveling on May 27 from Albany to the first night of the State Republican Committee's Nominating Convention in Syracuse, to tell O'Rourke and Colavita that his conference was concerned by Pirro's lack of political experience or statewide stature. Many Republicans also worried that if Pirro were nominated, their ticket would be too geographically dominated by downstate and the suburbs, with O'Rourke, like Pirro, being from Westchester, and the presumptive nominees for attorney general, Peter King and United States Senate, Alfonse D'Amato both hailing from Nassau County.

On May 28, just one day prior to the scheduled vote for the lieutenant gubernatorial nomination at the state party convention in Syracuse, Pirro announced her withdrawal from the race, saying that her husband could not disclose his legal clients or the couple's business interests (later revealed to have been her husband's partial ownership of a Connecticut garbage hauling company with alleged mafia connections),<ref name=garbage>She's a Politician. He Avoided Attention. Not Anymore, New York Times, Joseph Berger, April 17, 1997. Retrieved December 18, 2019.</ref> and that many of his clients did business with the state, which would make it "virtually impossible" for her to serve as Lieutenant Governor. Pirro had privately informed O'Rourke and Colavita of her decision during the evening of May 27, and the two were generally supportive, telling the press that her departure had nothing to do with Rappleyea's intervention. Pirro was replaced just six hours after her announcement by Michael Kavanagh, the District Attorney of Ulster County.

2006 U.S. Senate campaign
On August 10, 2005, Pirro announced that she would seek the Republican nomination to challenge first-term incumbent senator Hillary Clinton, a Democrat, in the 2006 election for U.S. Senator from New York. Other Republicans who announced campaigns for the nomination were John Spencer, a former mayor of Yonkers, William Brenner, an attorney in Sullivan County, and attorney Edward Cox, the son-in-law of former president Richard Nixon. In a widely publicized moment when she was declaring her candidacy, Pirro misplaced page 10 of her speech and went silent for 32 seconds, something that was widely considered to have damaged her campaign before it even started.

During an appearance at the Crime Victims Resource Center, Pirro described herself this way: "I am red on fiscal policy. I am conservative and I support the Bush tax cut... I have broad blue stripes when it comes to social issues... I am a woman who is a moderate in New York." Republican governor George Pataki's endorsement of Pirro caused Cox to withdraw from the race, leaving Pirro as the likely nominee. Donors to Pirro's political campaign included designer Tommy Hilfiger (also a native of Elmira) and Donald Trump, as well as contractors and real estate executives who had done business with her husband. Trump spoke highly of her husband at the time, saying: "Al has a good sense of the law and what's practical and a lot of common sense."

On December 21, 2005, Pirro dropped out of the Senate race after continuing pressure from party chiefs. This decision was reached after a lagging fundraising effort, and polls that showed she would be easily defeated by Clinton (a Quinnipiac University poll forecast Pirro would lose to Clinton 62 percent to 30 percent). In a statement, she said, "I have decided that my law enforcement background better qualifies me for a race for New York State attorney general than a race for the United States Senate." Spencer was eventually chosen as the Republican Party's nominee for the U.S. Senate.

During her four-month campaign, the Pirro campaign racked up $600,000 in debt to campaign vendors. By 2019, debts to vendors remained unpaid.

2006 State Attorney General campaign

On May 31, 2006, Pirro was unopposed for the nomination and became the Republican Party's official candidate for Attorney General of New York by acclamation at the state GOP convention. She also received the nominations of the New York Conservative and Independence Parties. Pirro lost the general election to the Democratic nominee, former Clinton Housing and Urban Development Secretary and future Governor Andrew Cuomo 58%–39%.

Books
Pirro is the author of six books, two of which are crime novels. Her first book was 2003's To Punish and Protect: A DA's Fight Against a System That Coddles Criminals. It was followed in 2004 by To Punish and Protect: Against a System That Coddles Criminals.

In 2012, Pirro's first fiction book, Sly Fox: A Dani Fox Novel, was released as a crime and legal thriller, followed in 2014 by the second novel in the series, Clever Fox: A Dani Fox Novel.

Her book Liars, Leakers, and Liberals: The Case Against the Anti-Trump Conspiracy (2018) is a look inside the Presidency of Donald Trump, as well as the politics surrounding the anti-Trump movement. Radicals, Resistance, and Revenge: The Left's Plot to Remake America (2019) is described as "the latest chapter in the unfolding liberal attack on our most basic values." Her book Don't Lie to Me: and Stop Trying to Steal Our Freedom was published on September 23, 2020.

Media career
Pirro has been a regular contributor to the syndicated morning talk show The Morning Show with Mike and Juliet. She has been a guest analyst on Today, Fox NY Good Day New York. She is a Fox News legal analyst appearing on various shows, and has guest-hosted shows such as Larry King Live, The Joy Behar Show, and Geraldo at Large. She was a frequent guest on Fox's late-night satire show Red Eye w/ Greg Gutfeld.

In 2003, Pirro released the nonfiction book To Punish and Protect, describing life inside the criminal justice system. In 2012, with the assistance of author Pete Earley, Pirro wrote the novel Sly Fox based on her own experiences as a 25-year-old assistant district attorney in Westchester. Pirro appears in the HBO six-part serial The Jinx, recounting her perspective on the 1983 disappearance of Kathie Durst, a high-profile case for which she was the investigating attorney. Pirro was the host of the American reality prime time court show You the Jury, canceled after two episodes.

Judge Jeanine Pirro on The CW
On May 5, 2008, The CW Television Network announced that Pirro would host a weekday television show to be named Judge Jeanine Pirro, part of the network's CW Daytime lineup, with two episodes airing daily. The show was distributed by Warner Bros. Domestic Television, and was carried by default on all CW affiliate stations.Judge Jeanine Pirro was cleared for a second season beginning in fall 2009. Unlike its first season, the second season, which began in the fall of 2009, was not exclusive to CW affiliates. In 2010 the show was nominated for Outstanding Legal/Courtroom Program at the 37th Daytime Emmy Awards, and in 2011 it won that category at the 38th Daytime Emmy Awards. In September 2011 the show was canceled due to low ratings.

Justice with Judge Jeanine on Fox News

Pirro is the host of Fox News' Justice with Judge Jeanine, which premiered in January 2011. The program airs on weekends and focuses on the big legal stories of the week.

In 2014, Pirro claimed ISIL leader Abu Bakr al-Baghdadi was "released by Obama in 2009". However, Baghdadi was held in custody until 2004, when he was released under the Bush administration.

In March 2019, on her show Justice with Judge Jeanine Pirro criticized Rep. Ilhan Omar for questioning the loyalty of American Jews to the US, by suggesting that Omar's Muslim faith meant she was more loyal to Sharia law than the US Constitution. Pirro said, "Omar wears a hijab which according to the Quran 33:59 tells women to cover so they won't get molested. Is her adherence to this Islamic doctrine indicative of her adherence to Sharia law, which in itself is antithetical to the United States constitution?" Fox News strongly condemned Pirro's statement. Pirro did not apologize for her remarks, and said that she intended to "start a debate." On March 16, 2019, Fox News decided not to air her show, replacing it with a rebroadcast of a Scandalous episode in its time slot. CNN reported on March 17 that Pirro had been suspended by Fox News, and President Trump wrote on Twitter: "Bring back @JudgeJeanine Pirro. Stop working soooo hard on being politically correct, which will only bring you down, and continue to fight for our Country." Justice with Judge Jeanine resumed airing on March 30, 2019.

In March 2020, she hosted the show from home due to the COVID-19 pandemic. She did not appear on air for the first 15 minutes citing "technical difficulties", with Jackie Ibañez covering for her, and when Pirro finally appeared, she was in a disheveled state, slurring her speech, causing widespread speculation that she was inebriated. After one commercial break, she was even seen putting aside a drink with a straw.

After the 2020 United States presidential election, Pirro was an outspoken proponent on her program of baseless allegations involving voting machine fraud that allegedly stole the election from Donald Trump. Hosts Lou Dobbs and Maria Bartiromo also promoted falsehoods on their programs. Smartmatic, a voting machine company that had been baselessly accused of conspiring with competitor Dominion Voting Systems to rig the election, sent Fox News a letter in December 2020 demanding retractions that "must be published on multiple occasions" so as to "match the attention and audience targeted with the original defamatory publications." The three programs each ran the same video segment refuting the baseless allegations days later, though none of the three hosts personally issued retractions.

On January 12, 2022, it was announced that Pirro would be a permanent co-host on The Five starting January 24, and ending Justice.

Political positions

Trump administration
Pirro supported Donald Trump in the 2016 presidential race, while also noting that she was "infuriated" by some of his behaviors. After the release of the Access Hollywood tape, Pirro defended Trump, stating "I have been involved in a million situations with him and his children. He has always been a gentleman."

After Trump's election, Pirro was known for delivering fiery defenses of the president. The Washington Post described her show as "almost universally positive about Trump," and Politico described her coverage of Trump as "gushing." According to Politico, "From the outset of the administration, she has used her TV platform to hammer the president's critics and to ding his allies, including Sessions, as insufficiently loyal."

In her televised programs and in private meetings with Trump at the White House, Pirro  "steadfastly encouraged Trump to press harder on his agenda of disruption and provocation." In 2017, Pirro called for the arrest of individuals who cooperated with special counsel Robert S. Mueller III's investigation into Russian interference in the 2016 election in favor of Trump. Pirro called for government agencies to be "cleansed" of critics of the president; she called for Deputy FBI Director Andrew McCabe and Peter Strzok to be arrested, and appeared to suggest that Mueller, former FBI director James B. Comey, and Associate Deputy Attorney General Bruce Ohr all be arrested as well. Pirro's comments were part of a broader push by Trump's allies in the media to delegitimize the Mueller probe and other investigations into Trump and his administration.

In February 2018, after two senior Trump administration officials resigned due to domestic abuse allegations, Pirro suggested that Barack Obama's policies were to blame for the two domestic abuse scandals. In May 2018, Pirro said that Trump had "fulfilled" a "biblical prophecy" by moving the US embassy in Israel to Jerusalem.

In June 2018, Pirro said Trump's pardon of conservative activist Dinesh D'Souza, who was convicted of "illegal campaign contributions" to a college friend, to whom he received support, was "fantastic news", as she believes D'Souza was singled out for prosecution for his politics by the FBI for having produced two political documentary movies: Hillary's America and Obama's America. Later that month, Politico reported that Pirro had, since late 2016, repeatedly told the Trump administration about her interest in becoming the Attorney General. On her show, Pirro had referred to Attorney General Jeff Sessions as "the most dangerous man in America."

In July 2018, after Trump was widely criticized, including by numerous prominent conservatives, for refusing to condemn Russian interference in the 2016 election, because it would have gained little leeway, while standing on stage with Vladimir Putin in Helsinki, Pirro defended Trump. Pirro said, "What was he supposed to do, take a gun out and shoot Putin?"

That same month, Trump posed with Pirro and her new book, Liars, Leakers, and Liberals: The Case Against the Anti-Trump Conspiracy, in the Oval Office. That Trump would promote the book of a pro-Trump advocate raised questions about potential ethics violations. Washington Post book critic Carlos Lozada described the book as a "sycophantic" and "gushing" pro-Trump book. PolitiFact found that Pirro's assertion in the book that Deputy Attorney General Rod Rosenstein had announced in February 2018 that "the Russia collusion investigation is over" was false; Rosenstein never said it and the progression of the Russia probe since February 2018 demonstrated otherwise.

In September 2018, while Supreme Court nominee Brett Kavanaugh faced scrutiny over sexual assault allegations, Pirro referred to the Democratic Party as "demon-rats".

On January 12, 2019, while on Fox, Pirro took a call on-air from Trump in which he spoke for 20 minutes, claiming his former attorney Michael Cohen fabricated stories to reduce the length of his expected sentence. Trump conjectured Cohen said, "I have an idea, I'll give you some information on the president," and he continued, "Well, there is no information." "He should give information maybe on his father-in-law, because that's the one that people want to look at." Pirro asked the name of Cohen's father-in-law, but Trump replied, though regarding the affairs of a private citizen, "I don't know, but you'll find out, and you'll look into it because nobody knows what's going on over there." The father-in-law, Fima Shusterman, owned condos both at Trump Tower and another in a Trump development near Miami.

In November 2019, she described Trump as "almost superhuman". In December 2019, she suggested that Trump had made it possible for people to say "Merry Christmas" again.

In February 2020, Pirro predicted that the impeachment of Donald Trump would be so unpopular that Democrats would lose their majority in the U.S. House of Representatives in the 2020 elections (which ultimately did not occur); Politico named Pirro's prediction one of "the most audacious, confident and spectacularly incorrect prognostications about the year".

Health care
Describing her own political positions in 2005, Pirro said, "I'm Republican red on fiscal policy with conservative beliefs on making tax cuts permanent, but I've got broad blue stripes on the social issues," during her campaign for the US Senate in New York. Her positions were described as politically moderate during her Senate run. Pirro supported a woman's right to an abortion, including U.S. taxpayer funding of abortion through Medicaid in 2005, though she has been opposed to late-term abortions.

LGBT rights
On the topic of LGBT rights, Pirro actively supported the passing of a New York hate crimes law which covered sexual orientation as a protected class in 2000. She was outspoken in her support for anti-discrimination protections for LGBT people during her 2006 campaign for State Attorney General. Pirro supported civil unions for same-sex couples. She also received an endorsement from the Log Cabin Republicans. She did not support same-sex marriage; however, Pirro opposed attempts to amend the Constitution in order to ban same-sex marriage, claiming: "Make no mistake, if it does become the law of this state, I will fight to defend it". Also in 2006, she acknowledged she participated in a Pride Parade and in a Log Cabin Republicans political fundraising event. Eight years later, she had William Owens, a representative of the National Organization for Marriage and opponent of same-sex marriage, to interview, on her program. In November 2021, Pirro attended the Log Cabin Republicans' "Spirit of Lincoln Award" event.

Benghazi
In 2014, Pirro called for the impeachment of Barack Obama  over the 2012 Benghazi attack.

Second Amendment
Of gun ownership, Pirro commented in December 2015: 

Personal life
Pirro has two children with her former spouse Albert. Following their marriage, they moved to Harrison, New York, where Pirro began working as assistant district attorney and her husband began work as a lobbyist. Later in their marriage, but before their children were born, Albert was accused of fathering a daughter by a Florida woman he termed as extortionate and mentally unstable. After his denials and extensive court proceedings, DNA testing confirmed him as the father and he was ordered to begin child support payments in 1998.

Following her tenure as D.A. and judge, Pirro returned to the private sector and began a new career as a TV personality and commentator. In 1997, People magazine named her one of its "50 Most Beautiful People".

On February 23, 1999, Pirro's husband was indicted by the office of United States Attorney for the Southern District of New York on one count of conspiracy, four counts of tax evasion, and 28 counts of filing a false tax return for hiding over $1 million in personal income as business expenses between 1988 and 1997. That day, Pirro appeared with her husband at a press conference in response to the charges, criticizing the investigation as "invasive and hostile." New York Governor George Pataki released a statement saying that the Pirros had been personal friends for "a long time," and that he and his wife "wished them well." With the trial beginning on May 15, 2000, and closing arguments given on June 19, 2000, the jury found Pirro's husband guilty on June 23, 2000, on 23 of the charges brought against him and not guilty of 10. In November 2000, he was sentenced to 29 months in federal prison, but received some leniency in exchange for waiving his right to appeal. He served 17 months in prison, being released early for good behavior and participating in an alcoholism treatment program. In the midst of the trial, Jeanine Pirro had attacked the prosecution for bringing up matters which involved her, calling it a "desperate attempt by them to bring me into this wherever they can." Albert Pirro was pardoned by President Donald Trump on January 20, 2021, shortly before Trump left office.

As a result of their "tumultuous" relationship, Pirro and her husband separated in 2007, with their divorce being finalized in 2013.

In November 2017, Pirro was charged with speeding for driving 119 miles per hour in upstate New York.

In July 2019, Pirro was named to the board of directors of the cannabis company HeavenlyRx, which manufactures CBD products.  Said Pirro: "My interest in CBD stems from a curiosity after hearing people say how much they benefited from CBD.... Initially a skeptic, I now understand there are tremendous benefits outside the assembly line of traditional medical and pharmaceutical dictates".

Pirro revealed in her 2018 book, Liars, Leakers, and Liberals: The Case Against the Anti-Trump Conspiracy'', that she was diagnosed with cancer in 2012. She is a practicing Catholic.

Lawsuit

On February 4, 2021, Pirro was named in the complaint "Smartmatic Files $2.7 Billion Defamation Lawsuit Against Fox Corporation" The complaint states that "Fox News’ disinformation campaign had a direct and harmful impact on Smartmatic's ability to conduct business in the United States and around the world". Smartmatic claims that Fox News Network, Maria Bartiromo, Lou Dobbs, Jeanine Pirro, Rudy Giuliani and Sidney Powell were primary sources of false information which were repeated by other media outlets, journalists, bloggers and influencers the world over. A New York State Supreme Court judge ruled in March 2022 that the suit against Fox News and others could proceed, though he dismissed allegations against Pirro.

See also
 New Yorkers in journalism

Notes

References

External links

 
 
  
 
 

1951 births
Living people
Albany Law School alumni
American politicians of Lebanese descent
American women lawyers
American critics of Islam
Businesspeople in the cannabis industry
Fox News people
American LGBT rights activists
New York (state) lawyers
New York (state) Republicans
New York (state) state court judges
Politicians from Elmira, New York
Television judges
University at Buffalo alumni
Westchester County District Attorneys
Politicians from Westchester County, New York
Women in New York (state) politics
American gun rights activists
21st-century American women
Catholics from New York (state)